Christian Volesky (born September 15, 1992) is an American soccer player who plays as a forward for Monterey Bay in the USL Championship.

College and amateur
Volesky played four years of college soccer, spending one year at the University of Denver and three years at SIU Edwardsville. While at college, Volesky appeared for USL PDL club FC Tucson during their 2014 season.
Volesky played four years at Foothill High School in Henderson, NV.

Club career
Volesky was named the 2015 MLS Combine Most Valuable Player after registering two goals in three games and finishing first in agility, 5–10–5, and second in the 30 meter sprint.

On January 15, 2015, Volesky was selected 32nd overall in the 2015 MLS SuperDraft by Portland Timbers. However, he did not sign with the club.

Rochester Rhinos
Volesky joined USL club Rochester Rhinos on March 24, 2015. Volesky helped lead the Rhinos to a 19-game unbeaten streak and the 2015 USL Championship. Volesky led the team in goals, with eight, and points, with 19, while also claiming three assists his rookie season. In his second season with the Rhinos, Volesky, again led the team with ten goals and twelve goals in all competitions, while adding four assists.

On January 9, 2017, Volesky's MLS rights were traded to Sporting Kansas City from Portland Timbers.

Saint Louis FC
On March 6, 2017, Saint Louis FC announced that they had signed Christian Volesky. Volesky was the club's leading scorer for the 2017 season.

Pittsburgh Riverhounds
After spending most of the 2018 season with USL side Oklahoma City Energy, Volesky joined Pittsburgh Riverhounds SC on February 7, 2019. Volesky scored his first goal for Pittsburgh on April 27, 2019 during a 2-2 draw against Nashville SC.

Colorado Springs Switchbacks
On January 8, 2020, Volesky made the move to USL Championship side Colorado Springs Switchbacks.

Keflavík
On April 9, 2021, Volesky moved to Icelandic Úrvalsdeild side Keflavík.

Monterey Bay
Volesky signed with USL Championship side Monterey Bay on February 2, 2022, ahead of their inaugural season. Volesky earned his first start for Monterey Bay on April 30, 2022, during a 6-0 road loss against San Antonio FC. On June 11, 2022, Volesky scored his first goal for Monterey Bay during a 3-2 loss to San Antonio FC. Following the 2022 season, Volesky and Monterey Bay agreed a new two-year contract.

References

External links
 

1992 births
Living people
American soccer players
Association football forwards
Colorado Springs Switchbacks FC players
Denver Pioneers men's soccer players
FC Tucson players
OKC Energy FC players
People from Henderson, Nevada
Pittsburgh Riverhounds SC players
Portland Timbers draft picks
Rochester New York FC players
Saint Louis FC players
SIU Edwardsville Cougars men's soccer players
Soccer players from Nevada
Sporting Kansas City players
Sportspeople from the Las Vegas Valley
USL Championship players
USL League Two players
American expatriate soccer players
Expatriate footballers in Iceland
Knattspyrnudeild Keflavík players
Monterey Bay FC players